Ormsin Chivapruck (born 1 April 1951) is a Thai civil servant and politician who served as Minister to the Office of the Prime Minister in the Cabinet of Thailand from 16 December 2016 to 24 November 2017. He is a former President of Thailand Post.

Early life
Ormsin was born on 1 April 1951 in Pathum Thani Province. He graduated high school level from Wat Hong Pathummawat School and then Bachelor of Economics from Aligarh Muslim University, India and Master of Business Administration from Kasetsart University continuous the Advanced Management Program from Harvard University, USA.

Career
He used to work under the Communications Authority of Thailand (CAT), holding the highest position as Deputy Governor of the Communications Authority of Thailand. Later, when being transformed into a public company he was then appointed as Senior Vice President of Finance and until being appointed as the President of the Thai Post Company Limited (TP) during the year 2007 to 2011.

Later, after the coup in Thailand in 2014 under government administration of National Council for Peace and Order he was appointed Chairman of the State Railway of Thailand. Later in August 2015, Ormsin was appointed Deputy Minister of Transport in Prayut Chan-o-cha government. In December 2016, he was appointed as Minister for the Office of the Prime Minister.

References

1951 births
Living people
Ormsin Chivapruck
Aligarh Muslim University alumni
Ormsin Chivapruck
Ormsin Chivapruck